The following is a list of cathedrals in Sweden.

A cathedral church is a Christian place of worship which is the chief, or 'mother' church of a diocese and is distinguished as such by being the location for the cathedra or bishop's seat.  In the strictest sense, only those Christian denominations with an episcopal hierarchy possess cathedrals. However the label 'cathedral' remains in common parlance for notable churches which were formerly part of an episcopal denomination.

Church of Sweden

Province of Uppsala

Roman Catholic Church

Province of Stockholm

Greek Orthodox Church

Metropolis of Sweden and all Scandinavia

Serbian Orthodox Church

Serbian Orthodox Eparchy of Britain and Scandinavia

Syriac Orthodox Church 
In Sweden there are two separate Syriac Orthodox Dioceses, each with its own bishop, both based in Södertälje.

Syriac Orthodox Archdiocese of Sweden and Scandinavia

Syriac Orthodox Patriarchate's Representation in Sweden

See also 
 List of cathedrals
 List of abbeys and priories in Sweden
 List of tallest church towers 
 Religion in Sweden

Architecture in Sweden
Cathedrals
Sweden
Cathedrals